The Commissioner of Internal Revenue is the head of the Internal Revenue Service (IRS), an agency within the United States Department of the Treasury.

The office of Commissioner was created by Congress as part of the Revenue Act of 1862. Section 7803 of the Internal Revenue Code provides for the appointment of a Commissioner of Internal Revenue to administer and supervise the execution and application of the internal revenue laws. The Commissioner is appointed by the President of the United States, with the consent of the  U.S. Senate, for a five-year term.

Daniel Werfel is the current Commissioner of Internal Revenue, having been sworn in on March 13, 2023. Werfel is the 50th Commissioner to serve in the position since it was created.

Responsibilities
The Commissioner's duties include administering, managing, conducting, directing, and supervising "the execution and application of the internal revenue laws or related statutes and tax conventions to which the United States is a party" and advising the President on the appointment and removal of a Chief Counsel of the IRS. Treasury Order 150-10 states in relevant part: "The Commissioner of Internal Revenue shall be responsible for the administration and enforcement of the Internal Revenue laws." The Commissioner reports to the Secretary of the Treasury through the Deputy Secretary of the Treasury.

One of the Commissioner's most important responsibilities with respect to the internal revenue laws is setting the Treasury Regulations administered by the IRS. The U.S. Treasury Regulations provide (in part):

(a) Issuance. --The Commissioner, with the approval of the United States Secretary of the Treasury, or his delegate, shall prescribe all needful rules and  all rules and regulations as may be necessary by reason of any alteration of law in relation to internal revenue.

However, the General Counsel of the Department of the Treasury has "the authority to approve all regulations pertaining to the internal revenue laws, including the authority to ratify and approve, where necessary, any such regulations previously issued."

Current and past commissioners

The following lists Commissioners of Internal Revenue, in chronological order:

References

External links

Internal Revenue Service Official website
Internal Revenue Service in the Federal Register

 
1862 establishments in the United States
Tax occupations